Chronicle, or fully Chronicle: The 20 Greatest Hits, is a greatest hits album by the American rock band Creedence Clearwater Revival. It was released in January 1976 by Fantasy Records. The edited version of "I Heard It Through the Grapevine" featured on the album was simultaneously released as a single (see 1976 in music).

Chronicle is a singles collection with 13 A-sides and seven B-sides. Unlike the two previously released Creedence Gold compilations, Chronicle includes all of the group's charted hits. Chronicle: Volume Two was released in 1986, and features non-charting "classics" collected from the same albums as the songs on Chronicle.

Certified Diamond by the Recording Industry Association of America, it is the best-selling album in the band's catalog. The compilation was ranked number 59 in Rolling Stone'''s list of the 500 Greatest Albums of all time in 2012,  but disappeared from the list altogether when it was published again in 2020. The album has sold at least 6 million copies in the US since 1991 (data from 2013), when Nielsen SoundScan began tracking sales for Billboard. It has remained on the Billboard 200 LP chart for 12 years, during which it reached the 600 week-mark (non-consecutive) in August of 2022. It was re-released on vinyl in 2014 as a Limited Edition.

 Critical reception 

For his review of Chronicle for AllMusic, Stephen Thomas Erlewine said that the album was suitably compiled, but he did not like how the Compact Disc reissue had the full-length version of "I Heard It Through the Grapevine," saying it does not fit with the other songs on the collection. Blender magazine's review called Chronicle'' the group's best compilation. Robert Christgau called the album a good starting-point for Creedence fans.

Track listing

Personnel 
Per liner notes
 John Fogerty vocals, lead guitar, production, arrangements
 Stu Cook bass
 Doug Clifford drums
 Tom Fogerty rhythm guitar, vocals (except on tracks 19 and 20)

Charts

Weekly charts

Year-end charts

Certifications

References 

Creedence Clearwater Revival compilation albums
1976 greatest hits albums
Fantasy Records compilation albums
Albums produced by John Fogerty
Albums produced by Stu Cook
Albums produced by Doug Clifford
Albums produced by Saul Zaentz